Adelheidsdorf is a municipality in the district of Celle, in Lower Saxony, Germany.

Adelheidsdorf was founded in 1831 after draining parts of the Wietzenbruch swamps in the area and named after the then Queen consort Adelaide of Hanover, Great Britain and Ireland.

References

Celle (district)
Adelaide of Saxe-Meiningen